Malootty is a 1990 Indian Malayalam-language survival drama film directed by Bharathan, starring Jayaram, Urvashi, and Shamili. The story is set in the 1980s, in which a girl is trapped in a drill hole and survives after many hours. The title drawings were done by Bharathan's son. Shamili won the Kerala State Film Award for Best Child Artist. It was based on the 1989 American television film Everybody's Baby: The Rescue of Jessica McClure.

Plot
Five-year-old Malootty is the only child of Raji and Unnikrishnan, who is on her vacation with them. Events take a tragic turn when she visits a vacation home, suddenly falls into a drill hole, and becomes stuck inside while playing ball with her dog. Unnikrishnan struggles to save her. It takes a few hours to do so.

Cast
Jayaram as Unnikrishnan 
Urvashi as Raji
Shamili as Malootty (Baby Shyamili)
K.P.A.C. Lalitha as Saraswathi 
Nedumudi Venu as Raghavan 
Innocent as Sankaran 
Devan as Wilson Cherian
 Priya (voice over by Valsamma)
Sreenath
Kunjandi
K.P.A.C.Ramachandran Nair as Doctor (voice over by Hari)

Soundtrack

References

External links

1990s Malayalam-language films
Indian films based on actual events
Films directed by Bharathan
Films scored by Johnson